Regarding humans, developmental plasticity is a general term referring to changes in neural connections during development as a result of environmental interactions as well as neural changes induced by learning. Much like neuroplasticity, or brain plasticity, developmental plasticity is specific to the change in neurons and synaptic connections as a consequence of developmental processes. A child creates most of these connections from birth to early childhood. There are three primary methods by which this may occur as the brain develops, but critical periods determine when lasting changes may form. Developmental plasticity may also be used in place of the term phenotypic plasticity when an organism in an embryonic or larval stage can alter its phenotype based on environmental factors. However, a main difference between the two is that phenotypic plasticity experienced during adulthood can be reversible, whereas traits that are considered developmentally plastic set foundations during early development that remain throughout the life of the organism.

Mechanisms
During development, the central nervous system acquires information via endogenous or exogenous factors as well as learning experiences. In acquiring and storing such information, the plastic nature of the central nervous system allows for the adaptation of existing neural connections in order to accommodate new information and experiences, resulting in developmental plasticity. This form of plasticity that occurs during development is the result of three predominant mechanisms: synaptic and homeostatic plasticity, and learning.

Synaptic plasticity
The underlying principle of synaptic plasticity is that synapses undergo an activity-dependent and selective strengthening or weakening so that new information can be stored. Synaptic plasticity depends on numerous factors including the threshold of the presynaptic stimulus in addition to the relative concentrations of neurotransmitter molecules. Synaptic plasticity has long been implicated for its role in memory storage and is thought to play a key role in learning.However, during developmental periods, synaptic plasticity is of particular importance, as changes in the network of synaptic connections can ultimately lead to changes in developmental milestones. For instance, the initial overproductionof synapses during development is key to plasticity that occurs in the visual and auditory cortices. In experiments conducted by Hubel and Wiesel, the visual cortex of kittens exhibits synaptic plasticity in the refinement of neural connections following visual inputs. Correspondingly, in the absence of such inputs during development, the visual field fails to develop properly and can lead to abnormal structures and behavior. Furthermore, research suggests that this initial overproduction of synapses during developmental periods provides the foundation by which many synaptic connections can be formed, thus resulting in more synaptic plasticity. In the same way that synapses are abundant during development, there are also refining mechanisms that assist in the maturation of synapses in neural circuits. This regulatory process allows the strengthening of important or frequently used synaptic connections while reducing the amount of weak connections.

Homeostatic plasticity
In order to maintain balance, homeostatic controls exist to regulate the overall activity of neural circuits specifically by regulating the destabilizing effects of developmental and learning processes that result in changes of synaptic strength. Homeostatic plasticity also helps regulate prolonged excitatory responses, which lead to a reduction in all of a neuron's synaptic responses. While the exact mechanisms by which homeostatic plasticity acts remains unclear, recent studies raise the idea that homeostatic plasticity is modulated according to the period of development or challenges in existing neural circuits.

Learning
While synaptic plasticity is considered to be a by-product of learning, learning requires interaction with the environment to acquire the new information or behavior, whereas synaptic plasticity merely represents the change in strength or configuration of neural circuits. Learning is of crucial importance postnatally as there is considerable interaction with the environment and the potential for acquiring new information is greatest. By depending largely upon selective experiences, neural connections are altered and strengthened in a manner that is unique to those experiences. Experimentally this can be seen when rats are raised in an environment that allows ample social interaction, resulting in increased brain weight and cortical thickness. In contrast, the adverse is seen following rearing in an environment devoid of interaction. Also, learning plays a size-able role in the selective acquisition of information and is markedly demonstrated as children develop one language as opposed to another. Another example of such experience dependent plasticity that is critical during development is the occurrence of imprinting. This occurs as a result of the young child or animal experiencing a novel stimuli and rapidly learning the behavior in response.

Neural Development
The formation of the nervous system is one of the most crucial events in the developing embryo. Specifically, the differentiation of stem cell precursors into specialized neurons gives rise to the formation of synapses and neural circuits, which is key to the principle of plasticity. During this pivotal point in development, consequent developmental processes like the differentiation and specialization of neurons are highly sensitive to exogenous and endogenous factors. For example, in utero exposure to nicotine has been linked to adverse effects such as severe physical and cognitive deficits as a result of impeding the normal activation of acetylcholine receptors. In a recent study, the connection between such nicotine exposure and prenatal development was assessed. It was determined that nicotine exposure in early development can have a lasting and encompassing effect on neuronal structures, underlying the behavioral and cognitive defects observed in exposed humans and animals. Additionally, by disrupting proper synaptic function through nicotine exposure, the overall circuit may become less sensitive and responsive to stimuli, resulting in compensatory developmental plasticity. It is for this reason that exposure to various environmental factors during developmental periods can cause profound effects on subsequent neural functioning.

Neural refinement and connectivity 

Initial stages of neural development begin early on in the fetus with spontaneous firing of the developing neuron. These early connections are weak and often overlap at the terminal ends of the arbors. The young neurons have complete potential of changing morphology during a time span classified as the critical period, to achieve strengthened and refined synaptic connections. It is during this time that damaged neuronal connections can become functionally recovered. Large alterations in length and location of these neurons can occur until synaptic circuitry is further defined. Although organization of neural connections begins at the earliest stages of development, activity-driven refinement only begins at birth when the individual neurons can be recognized as separate entities and start to enhance in specificity. The gradual pruning of the initially blurry axonal branching occurs via competitive and facilitative mechanisms relying on electrical activity at the synapses: axons that fire independently of each other tend to compete for territory whereas axons that synchronously fire mutually amplify connections. Until this architecture has been established, retinal focus remains diffuse. Perpetuation of these newly formed connections or the lack thereof depends on maintenance of electrical activities at the synapses. Upon refinement, the elaborate connections narrow and strengthen to fire only in response to specific stimuli in order to optimize visual acuity. These mechanisms can malfunction with the introduction of toxins, which bind to sodium channels and suppress action potentials and consequently electrical activity between synapses.

Quantification of the prevalence of synaptic networks has primarily been through retinal wave detection using Ca2+ fluorescent indicators. Prior to birth, retinal waves are seen to originate as clusters that propagate through the refractory region. These assays have been shown to provide spatiotemporal data on the random bursts of action potentials produced in a refractory period. Another assay recently developed to assess depth of neuronal connections is through the use of trans-neuronal spread of rabies. This method of tracing employs the migration of a neurotropic virus through tightly interconnected neurons and specific site labeling of distinct connections. Patch-clamping experiments and calcium imaging often follow up preliminary results from this assay in order to detect spontaneous neuronal activity.

Critical period
The concept of critical periods is a widely accepted and prominent theme in development, with strong implications to developmental plasticity. Critical periods establish a time frame in which the shaping of neural networks can be carried out. During these critical periods in development, plasticity occurs as a result of changes in the structure or function of developing neural circuits. Such critical periods can also be experience-dependent, in the instance of learning via new experiences, or can be independent of the environmental experience and rely on biological mechanisms including endogenous or exogenous factors. Again, one of the most pervading examples of this can be seen in the development of the visual cortex in addition to the acquisition of language as a result of developmental plasticity during the critical period. A lesser known example, however, remains the critical development of respiratory control during developmental periods. At birth, the development of respiratory control neural circuits is incomplete, requiring complex interactions from both the environment and internal factors. Experimentally exposing two week-old kittens and rats to hyperoxic conditions, completely eliminates the carotid chemoreceptor response to hypoxia, and consequently resulting in respiratory impairment. This has dramatic clinical significance as newborn infants are often supplemented with considerable amounts of oxygen, which could detrimentally affect the way in which neural circuits for respiratory control develop during the critical period. Additionally, when stimuli or experiences are elicited outside of the critical period, usually the results have little to no lasting effect, which could also lead to severe developmental impairment.

Spontaneous network activity
Another lesser known element of developmental plasticity includes spontaneous bursts of action potentials in developing neural circuits, also referred to as spontaneous network activity. During the early development of neural connections, excitatory synapses undergo spontaneous activation, resulting in elevated intracellular calcium levels which signals the onset of innumerable signaling cascades and developmental processes. As an example, prior to birth neural circuits in the retina undergo spontaneous network activity, which has been found to elicit the formation of retinogeniculate connections. Examples of spontaneous network activity during development are also exhibited in the proper formation of neuromuscular circuits. It is believed that spontaneous network activity establishes a scaffold for subsequent learning and information acquisition following the initial establishment of synaptic connections during development.

See also 
 Hebbian theory
 Long-term potentiation
 Long-term depression
 NMDA receptor
 GABA receptor
 Cultured neuronal network
Developmental plasticity in Drosophila melanogaster

References

Further reading 

 
 
 
 
 
 
 
 
 

Neurophysiology